Roy High School can refer to:
Roy High School (Montana) in Roy, Montana
Roy High School (New Mexico), in Roy, New Mexico
Roy High School (Utah), in Roy, Utah

See also
Le Roy High School, in Le Roy, New York